Carib is an album by David Sánchez, released by the record label Ropeadope on June 7, 2019. It received a 2020 Grammy Award nomination for Best Latin Jazz Album.

References

2019 albums
Jazz albums by Puerto Rican artists
Latin jazz albums
Ropeadope Records albums